Nenad Milijaš (born 30 April 1983) is a retired Serbian footballer. He represented Serbia at the 2010 FIFA World Cup.

Milijaš rose to prominence in his homeland with his first club FK Zemun before moving to Red Star Belgrade where he won league and cup honours. Decorated with individual awards for his performances at Red Star, he broke into the Serbian national side in 2008. He moved to England in 2009 when he signed for Premier League side Wolverhampton Wanderers but returned to his former club three years later.

Club career

Zemun
Milijaš began his playing career in the youth ranks of Belgrade-based FK Zemun, where he progressed through to make it into their first team in 2000. He really began to establish himself in the middle of the park during the 2001–02 season and was a vital player for the club over the following seasons. In 2005–06, he had his best goalscoring start to a season, netting eight times by Christmas. This attracted attention from the country's biggest club and local rival, Red Star Belgrade.

Red Star Belgrade
Following his continually impressive form for FK Zemun, Milijaš signed for Red Star Belgrade in January 2006. He ended his first season with Belgrade by winning both the Serbian Superliga and Serbian Cup with his new club. He won both trophies again with Belgrade the following season. Milijaš found appearances restricted by then manager Dusan Bajević, but the arrival of Boško Djurovski as the club's new manager saw him gain more playing time and re-discover his form. He then held down a first team spot in central midfield for the following seasons, becoming a vital member of the team as they went close to more domestic honours and regularly competing in European competitions. Milijaš enjoyed his best season so far in 2008–09, finishing Red Star's top goalscorer with 18 league goals, 22 goals in all competitions, making him Serbian football's leading scorer in that season. He also won the league's Most Valuable Player Award, was voted into the All Star Team, named 2008–09 Serbian Superliga Player of the Year and broke into the Serbia national football team. This form attracted attention from various clubs in Europe.

Wolverhampton Wanderers
Newly promoted Premier League side Wolves signed Milijaš on 15 June 2009 in a four-year deal for an undisclosed fee, believed to be around £2.6 million. He made his debut in August 2009, in the club's 2–0 opening day defeat to West Ham, in which he was voted Sky Sports' man of the match. Milijaš scored his first goal for Wolves with a long-distance strike to earn a 2–1 home win against Bolton in December 2009; before netting a second and final goal for the season two weeks later, against Burnley.

Milijaš made twenty appearances in the Premier League in the 2010–11 season, scoring twice. He also matched that tally in the League Cup, scoring two penalties, against Southend and Notts County. In a 3–3 home draw against Tottenham Hotspur, Milijaš created two goals by assisting Kevin Doyle's opening goal, and then winning a penalty for a second Doyle goal. He also featured in the team's victory at Aston Villa as Wolves narrowly stayed up on the final day of the season.

Milijaš made only sporadic appearances during the next season, but during November and December he enjoyed a run of starts in the team. However, this was halted when he was sent off in a 1–1 draw at Arsenal for a challenge on Mikel Arteta. Wolves made an appeal to have this red card rescinded, including a unique press conference by then-manager Mick McCarthy who showed slow motion replays from a number of angles, but the appeal was unsuccessful and the three-match ban was upheld. Following this dismissal he only made a number of substitute appearances in the final months as the club were relegated under caretaker manager Terry Connor.

Following the appointment of Ståle Solbakken as Wolves manager during the close season, it was announced that Milijaš was available for transfer, having expressed a desire to play more regularly. On 30 August, his contract was cancelled by mutual consent to allow him to find a new club.

Return to Red Star Belgrade
On 31 August 2012, one day after his departure from Wolves, Milijaš rejoined his former club Red Star Belgrade when he signed a three-year deal. He scored his first goal against Radnički Kragujevac 1923 from a free kick. On 13 April 2013, he scored a hat-trick against FK Spartak Zlatibor Voda.

Hebei China Fortune
On 16 February 2015, Milijaš transferred to China League One side Hebei China Fortune.

Nei Mongol Zhongyou
On 14 February 2016, Milijaš transferred to fellow China League One side Nei Mongol Zhongyou.

Red Star Belgrade
On January 31, 2017, Milijaš rejoined his club Red Star for a third time. An avid Red Star fan, Milijaš once again proved loyalty to his club and fans. Milijaš signed one and a half year deal. On May 19, 2019, he played his last game for Red Star in a 3–0 win over Napredak. During his 9 years altogether in Red Star, Milijas played 170 matches, scored 49 goals and had 38 assists. He also won 4 trophies, all 4 being Serbian SuperLiga in 06/07, 13/14, 17/18 and 18/19 seasons.

International career
Milijaš represented Serbia and Montenegro at under-21 level, appearing in the side which made the semi finals of the 2006 European Under-21 Championship in Portugal.

Milijaš made his full international debut for Serbia on 6 September 2008, in a 2–0 win over the Faroe Islands in a World Cup 2010 qualifier. He scored his first international goal in his fourth appearance, in a 6–1 rout of Bulgaria in a friendly on 19 November 2008, then added his first competitive goal when he netted the winner from the penalty spot to defeat Austria 1–0 on 6 June 2009. This qualification campaign ultimately saw the nation qualify for the 2010 FIFA World Cup Finals in South Africa, with Milijaš a regular in central midfield, usually paired with captain Dejan Stanković.

In June 2010, he was selected in Serbia's squad for the 2010 FIFA World Cup, where he appeared in group stage match against Ghana.

Career statistics

Club

International

International goals
Scores and results list Serbia's goal tally first.

Honours
Club
 Serbian SuperLiga (5): 2005–06, 2006–07, 2013–14, 2017–18, 2018–19
 Serbian Cup (2): 2005–06, 2006–07

Individual
Serbian SuperLiga: Player of the Season 2008–09
 Serbian SuperLiga Team of the Season: 2008–09

References

External links

Player profile on Serbian National Team page

1983 births
Living people
Footballers from Belgrade
Serbian footballers
Serbia international footballers
Serbia and Montenegro under-21 international footballers
FK Zemun players
Red Star Belgrade footballers
Wolverhampton Wanderers F.C. players
Hebei F.C. players
Inner Mongolia Zhongyou F.C. players
Serbian SuperLiga players
Premier League players
China League One players
Serbian expatriate footballers
Expatriate footballers in England
Expatriate footballers in Turkey
Expatriate footballers in China
Association football midfielders
2010 FIFA World Cup players
Red Star Belgrade non-playing staff